The State Legislative Council, or Vidhan Parishad, or Saasana Mandali is the upper house in those states of India that have a bicameral state legislature; the lower house being the State Legislative Assembly. Its establishment is defined in Article 169 of the Constitution of India.

Only 6 out of 28 states have a Legislative Council. These are Andhra Pradesh, Karnataka, Telangana, Maharashtra, Bihar, and Uttar Pradesh. No union territory has a legislative council.

Qualification and tenure
Members of a State Legislative Council (MLC) must be a citizen of India, at least 30 years old, mentally sound, not an insolvent, and must be an enrolled voter of the state. A member may not be a Member of Parliament and Member of the State Legislative Assembly at the same time.The tenure of the MLCs are six years. One-third of the members of State Legislative Council retire after every two years. This arrangement parallels that for the Rajya Sabha, the upper house of the Parliament of India.

Composition
The size of the State Legislative Council cannot be more than one third of the membership of the State Legislative Assembly. However, its size cannot be less than 40 members. These members elect the Chairman and Deputy Chairman of the State Legislative Council.

MLCs are chosen in the following manner:
One third are elected by the members of local bodies such as municipalities, Gram panchayats, Panchayat samitis and district councils.
One third are elected by the members of Legislative Assembly of the State from among the persons who are not members of the State Legislative Assembly.
One sixth are nominated by the Governor from persons having knowledge or practical experience in fields such as literature, science, arts, the co-operative movement and social services.
One twelfth are elected by persons who are graduates of three years' standing residing in that state.
One twelfth are elected by teachers who had spent at least three years in teaching in educational institutions within the state not lower than secondary schools, including colleges and universities.

Creation, abolition and roles of State Legislative Councils
According to the Article 169 of the Constitution of India, the Parliament of India can create or abolish the State Legislative Council of a state if that state's legislature passes a resolution for that with a special majority. As of February 2023, 6 out of the 28 states have State Legislative Council.

The existence of a State Legislative Council has proven politically controversial. A number of states that have had their Legislative Council abolished have subsequently requested its re-establishment; conversely, proposals for the re-establishment of the Legislative Council for a state have also met with opposition. Proposals for abolition or re-establishment of a state's Legislative Council require confirmation by the Parliament of India.

The Constitution of India gives limited power to the State Legislative Council. The State Legislative Council can neither  form or dissolve a state government. The State Legislative Council also have no role in the passing of money bills. But some of the powers it has is that the Chairman and Deputy Chairman of the State Legislative Council enjoy the same status of Cabinet Ministers in the state.

Current State Legislative Councils

State Legislative Councils by ruling parties

The Bharatiya Janata Party-led National Democratic Alliance is in power in 2 legislative councils; the Indian National Congress-led United Progressive Alliance is in power in 2 legislative councils; 2 legislative councils are ruled by other parties/alliances; and 30 other states/union territories do not have a legislative council.

Former State Legislative Councils

Proposed State Legislative Councils
 Rajasthan Legislative Council -  On April 18, 2012, the Rajasthan Legislative Assembly passed a resolution to create a Legislative Council for the state of Rajasthan with 66 members. The Rajasthan Legislative Council Bill, 2013 was introduced in the Rajya Sabha on August 6, 2013 and has been referred to the Standing Committee on Law and Justice.

Criticism and support
The State Legislative Councils are criticised for being unnecessary. It is considered a burden on the state budget and cause delays in passing legislation. State legislative council helps the defeated leaders to get a seat in the state legislature. This reduces the feeling of democracy, since the leaders are elected indirectly. These are the reasons why most of the states don't prefer legislative councils.

Other states support the establishment of legislative councils, arguing that they represent the local governments and also give voice to people having expertise in various fields (through Gubernatorial nominations).

See also
State Legislature
Upper house
Rajya Sabha
Council of State
Legislative council
State governments of India
Politics of India

References